The 1984 Espirito Santo Trophy took place 30 October – 2 November at Hong Kong Golf Club in Fonling, Hong Kong. It was the 11th women's golf World Amateur Team Championship for the Espirito Santo Trophy. The tournament was a 72-hole stroke play team event with 22 teams, each with three players. The best two scores for each round counted towards the team total.

The United States team won the Trophy, defending the title from two years ago and winning their ninth title, beating team France by two strokes. France earned the silver medal while the combined team of Great Britain and Ireland took the bronze on third place another three strokes behind.

Teams 
22 teams contested the event. Each team had three players.

Results 

Sources:

Individual leaders 
There was no official recognition for the lowest individual scores.

References

External links 
World Amateur Team Championships on International Golf Federation website

Espirito Santo Trophy
Golf in Hong Kong
Espirito Santo Trophy
Espirito Santo Trophy
Espirito Santo Trophy
Espirito Santo Trophy